WWW (or www) is an initialism for World Wide Web. In English, WWW is the longest possible three-letter abbreviation when spoken, requiring six to nine syllables, depending on how it is pronounced, whereas the twelve letters in "World Wide Web" are pronounced with three syllables. The English writer Douglas Adams once quipped:

Tim Berners-Lee rejected suggestions to change the World Wide Web name over pronunciation issues, arguing that this peculiar feature of the name would make it memorable. As his invention gradually gained ubiquity, it came to be called simply the Web.

English pronunciation
In standard English pronunciation, www is pronounced by individually pronouncing the names of the letters ( or double-u double-u double-u). However, in colloquial speech the name of the letter W is sometimes shortened.

The form dub-dub-dub has long been used occasionally worldwide, but is the most common abbreviation used in New Zealand.

An abbreviation W3 ( "double-u cubed") is inspired from mathematical notation for exponentiation (W raised to the 3rd power). Many of the original papers describing the World Wide Web abbreviated it this way, and the World Wide Web Consortium (W3C) was named according to this early usage. The original W3C logo had a superscript 3 and the consortium's domain name is still www.w3.org.

Other languages
In Afrikaans, Dutch, German, Polish and other languages, this problem doesn't occur because the letter W is already uttered as a single syllable.

In some languages, such as Danish, Estonian, Finnish, Norwegian, and Swedish it is common practice to say "ve"(v) instead of "dobbelt-ve" in abbreviations, so "www" becomes "ve, ve, ve". This is also used by Romanian, Serbian, etc. In Danish, it is also usual to say "tre gange dobbelt-ve" ("three times double u").

In many languages which give the letter W a name that translates to "double V", each w is substituted by a v, so www is shortened to "vvv" instead. Another practice is to use a numeric shortcut that translates w-w-w as triple W.

 In Standard Mandarin of China, is called "sān double u" which means three w (3w).
 In Taiwanese Mandarin, is pronounced as "triple w" in English.
 Japanese uses a transliteration of the English pronunciation –  (ダブリューダブリューダブリュー).
 "vé, vé, vé" in both Czech and Slovak (Literally means vvv. The formally correct but infrequently used form has 12 syllables: dvojité vé, dvojité vé, dvojité vé.)
 "vee vee vee" (commonly used) in Estonian (correct, but used less often, is "kaksisvee kaksisvee kaksisvee")
 "vee vee vee" in Finnish (The pronunciation of W in this context has been adopted from German)
 "double vé, double vé, double vé" in French. Most French speakers prefer the "3w" form, pronounced "trois doubles-vés" (most television and radio commercials in French speaking countries use this pronunciation) or – less frequently – "triple double-vé". Some Belgians tend to use the Dutch pronunciation.
 "vé, vé, vé" in Hungarian (Literally means vvv. The formally correct but infrequently used form has nine syllables: dupla vé, dupla vé, dupla vé.) Sometimes "tripladuplavé" can be heard, too.
 "tvöfalt vaff, tvöfalt vaff, tvöfalt vaff" or "vaff, vaff, vaff" in Icelandic
 "dupult ve, dupult ve, dupult ve" or "ve, ve, ve" in Faroese. Double-u is not part of the Faroese alphabet and is normally substituted by using V in its stead, leading to the latter, shorter pronunciation.
 "vu vu vu" in Italian, despite being technically incorrect (it is one of the possible pronunciations for "vvv").
 "ве-ве-ве" in Macedonian (pronounced ve-ve-ve)
 "dablio, dablio, dablio" in Portuguese
 "dáblio, dáblio, dáblio" in Brazilian Portuguese
 "вэ-вэ-вэ" in Russian (pronounced ve-ve-ve). It may be heard in the "WWW" song by the band Leningrad. However, the official pronunciation is "тройное дабл-ю" ("triple double-u")
 "ве-ве-ве" in Serbian (pronounced ve-ve-ve). Another frequently used way to pronounce it is в-в-в (v-v-v) without any vowels. Correct, but used less often, is "duplove-duplove-duplove".
 In Spanish, "3w" can be either "triple doble v", "triple doble u", "uve doble uve doble uve doble", "tres uve dobles", "triple uve doble", "doble u, doble u, doble u", "ve doble, ve doble, ve doble" (Latin America), "doble ve, doble ve, doble ve" (Argentina) or "tres uve(s) dobles" (Spain).
 "dabıl yu, dabıl yu, dabıl yu" or "çift ve, çift ve, çift ve" or "ve ve ve" in Turkish
 "Double-u,Double-u,Double-u" in Arabic
 "дабл ю, дабл ю, дабл ю" (pronounced "double u, double u, double u") in Ukrainian, although "дабі, дабі, дабі" (dabi-dabi-dabi), "ве, ве, ве" (ve-ve-ve) and (officially) "потрійне дабл ю" are also used.
 "vê kép, vê kép, vê kép" in Vietnamese.
 In Welsh, the standard pronunciation is "w-driphlyg" ("triple-w") – as w is a vowel in Welsh, it is pronounced as 'oo', so the acronym's name is only 3 syllables long.

References

World Wide Web
Phonology